Ernest Noel Park , known as Noel Park (5 December 1920 – 16 September 1994) was an Australian soldier, grazier and politician, affiliated with the National Party and elected as a member of the New South Wales Legislative Assembly.

Park served as the Member for Tamworth between 1973 and 1991.

In the 1995 Australia Day Honours Park was posthumously award the Medal of the Order of Australia for "service to the New South Wales Parliament and to the community".

References

 

Members of the New South Wales Legislative Assembly
National Party of Australia members of the Parliament of New South Wales
1920 births
1994 deaths
20th-century Australian politicians
Recipients of the Medal of the Order of Australia